Digra or digras, or variation, may refer to:

People
 Moald Digra (7th c.), a mythical character from the Saga of Halfdan the Valiant
 Olaf II of Norway (995–1030) known as 
 Þorbjörg “digra” Ólafsdóttir (born 960), ancestress of Jón korpur Hrafnsson

Places
 Digra, Aksai Chin, India/China; see List of locations in Aksai Chin
 Digras, Yavatmal, Maharastra, India; a city

Other uses
 Digital Games Research Association (DiGRA)
 dissociated glucocorticoid receptor agonist (DIGRA, DIGRAs)

See also

 Digre
 Digri
 Digraph (disambiguation)
 GRA (disambiguation)